Symmoca vetusta is a moth in the family Autostichidae. It was described by Edward Meyrick in 1931. It is found in Brazil.

References

Moths described in 1931
Symmoca